Ernst Eckstein (6 February 1845, Giessen, Grand Duchy of Hesse –18 November 1900) was a German humorist, novelist and poet.

Biography
From the university he went to Paris, where he completed his comic epos, Check to the Queen (1870), and wrote Paris Silhouettes (1873), the grotesque night-piece The Varzin Ghosts, and the Mute of Seville. Later he wrote the stories Margherita, At the Tomb of Cestius, The Mosque at Cordova. He was editor of a literary and critical journal, Hall of Poets, and of a humorous weekly, The Wag, at Leipzig, for some years, and in 1885 settled in Dresden. He also wrote The Claudii, Aphrodite, a Story of Ancient Hellas, Decius the Flute-player: a Merry Story of a Musician in Ancient Rome.

Works
 Venus Urania, 1872
 Humoresken, 1875/82
 Beiträge zur Geschichte des Feuilletons, 1876
 Lisa Toscanella (Novellae), 1876
 Pariser Leben, 1876
 Ein Pessimist (Comedy), 1877
 Sturmnacht (Novellae), 1878
 Die Claudier (Novel), 1881
 Prusias. Roman aus dem letzten Jahrhundert der römischen Republik, 1884
 Jorinde (Novel), 1888
 Nero (Novel), 1889
 Das Kind (Novellae), 1893
 Verstehen wir Deutsch? Volkstümliche Sprachuntersuchungen, 1894
 Familie Hartwig (Novel), 1894
 Roderich Löhr (Novel), 1896
 Willibald Menz. Lavafluten (Novel), 1898
 Die Klosterschülerin (Novel), 1899
 Die Märchenprinzessin (Novel), 1901
 Gesammelte Schulhumoresken, 1907

Notes

References

External links

 
 
 

1845 births
1900 deaths
People from Giessen
People from the Grand Duchy of Hesse
19th-century German poets
Writers from Hesse
German male poets
German male novelists
19th-century German novelists
19th-century German male writers